Tam Sheung-wai (1934 – 1 January 2021) OBE, GBS, JP was the President Emeritus of The Open University of Hong Kong. He is widely recognised for his many contributions towards the development of distance education in Hong Kong. He was also the Chairman of the College Council of St. Paul's Co-educational College.

Early life
Tam received bachelor's and master's degrees in science from the University of Hong Kong. In 1964, he obtained a PhD in chemistry from the University of Nottingham.

Career
Tam joined Chung Chi College, part of the Chinese University of Hong Kong (CUHK), as a chemistry lecturer in 1965.

He served as head of the Chinese University's graduate school from 1981 until 1993, and as a pro-vice-chancellor of the university from 1990 to 1994. Tam retired from CUHK in 1995, the same year he was appointed president of OUHK. Tam retired from the presidency in November 2003.

See also
 Education in Hong Kong

References

1934 births
2021 deaths
Heads of universities in Hong Kong
Alumni of the University of Hong Kong
Fellows of Robinson College, Cambridge
Officers of the Order of the British Empire
Academic staff of Hong Kong Metropolitan University
Members of the Selection Committee of Hong Kong